María Magda Cangá Valencia (born September 27, 1962) is a female judoka from Ecuador. She competed for her native country at the 1992 Summer Olympics in Barcelona, Spain, where she was defeated in the first round and carried the national flag at the opening ceremony. Cangá won the silver medal in the Women's Half Heavyweight (– 72 kg) division at the 1991 Pan American Games in Havana, Cuba, after having gained bronze four years earlier in Indianapolis.

References
sports-reference

1962 births
Living people
Ecuadorian female judoka
Judoka at the 1992 Summer Olympics
Olympic judoka of Ecuador
Pan American Games silver medalists for Ecuador
Pan American Games bronze medalists for Ecuador
Pan American Games medalists in judo
Judoka at the 1987 Pan American Games
Judoka at the 1991 Pan American Games
Medalists at the 1987 Pan American Games
Medalists at the 1991 Pan American Games
21st-century Ecuadorian women
20th-century Ecuadorian women